Niall Henderson (born 7 February 1988) is a Northern Irish footballer who plays for NIFL Championship side Annagh United.

Career
Henderson is from Craigavon, County Armagh. He grew up in Lurgan and played snooker as a child, going on to represent Northern Ireland as a junior international in 2003. He was on the books at Portadown as a youth player, before moving to Scotland with Gretna at the age of 16. He first featured on the bench for Gretna in their 2–1 defeat to Stirling Albion on 29 April 2006 in the Scottish Football League Second Division, and was subsequently on the bench for the 2006 Scottish Cup Final against Heart of Midlothian, which was lost 4–2 on penalties after a 1–1 draw after extra time on 13 May 2006. He was loaned out to Dumbarton in the Scottish Third Division in August 2007 until January 2008, during which he made 16 appearances and scored one goal. He was released by Gretna in January and signed for Raith Rovers later that month on a short-term deal to the end of the 2007–08 season, making his debut in the 1–0 victory at Queens Park on 19 January 2008 at Hampden Park. Henderson featured for the side in both legs of their play-off semi-final defeat to Airdrie United and finished the season with 16 Raith appearances.

He was released by Raith after the end of the season, after which he joined York City in the Conference Premier on 18 June 2008. He made his debut in a 1–0 victory against Wrexham on 14 August 2008 after coming on as a 62nd-minute substitute. He was named in the Northern Ireland under-21 team in September for their 2009 UEFA European Under-21 Football Championship qualifying game against Germany. Henderson was on the bench as Northern Ireland were beaten 3–0, meaning they were unable to quality for the tournament. He made his return for York in a 4–2 defeat to Kettering Town, which was the team's first loss of the season. He suffered from two viruses within the space of four weeks, and returned to light training in October. He continued to play for the reserve team and scored in a 4–4 draw against Barnsley reserves. Henderson had fallen out favour under manager Colin Walker and struggled to feature in the team. He picked up a hamstring injury during a training session in December. He was released by the club on 20 January and returned to Ireland to sign for either Finn Harps or Newry City, eventually signing for Newry.

On 6 July 2010, Henderson joined Dungannon Swifts on a one-year deal along with Johnny Topley after his contract with his previous employers, Newry City, expired. In June 2011 he joined Glenavon.

Career statistics
As of 13 September 2008.

Footnotes

A.  The "Other" column constitutes appearances and goals (including those as a substitute) in the play-offs.

References

External links

1988 births
Living people
People from Craigavon, County Armagh
Association footballers from Northern Ireland
Association football midfielders
Portadown F.C. players
Gretna F.C. players
Dumbarton F.C. players
Raith Rovers F.C. players
York City F.C. players
Newry City F.C. players
Scottish Football League players
National League (English football) players
Glenavon F.C. players
Annagh United F.C. players
Dungannon Swifts F.C. players
Glentoran F.C. players